Rafaï Airport  is an airstrip serving Rafaï, a village in the Mbomou prefecture of the Central African Republic. Rafaï village lines the RN2 road, and the runway is located mid-village just off the road.

See also

Transport in the Central African Republic
List of airports in the Central African Republic

References

External links 
OpenStreetMap - Rafaï
OurAirports - Rafaï Airport

Airports in the Central African Republic
Buildings and structures in Mbomou